Bozcaadalı Hasan Hüsnü Pasha (1832–1903) was an Ottoman admiral, who participated in the Russo-Turkish War (1877–78). In 1880 he became the Minister of the Ottoman Navy (Bahriye Nazırı).

Gallery

References

1832 births
1903 deaths
Military personnel from Istanbul
Ottoman Empire admirals